Kim Briggs may refer to:

 Kim Briggs (Scrubs), a character from the TV series Scrubs
 Kim Briggs (handballer) (born 1977), Australian handball player